Entertainment Spotlight was an English-language entertainment news program on CTV in Quebec that aired on Sundays. The program was hosted on location in trendy locations in Montreal, and focused on movies and leisure in-and-around the city. It featured interviews with movie stars.

Entertainment Spotlight was hosted by Mose Persico and Natasha Hall (2008) (Orla Johannes 2000–2008).

The fresh and talented TV Host, Jeremy Szafron was also a host on the show.

Shot on location, Entertainment Spotlight was a fast-paced movie entertainment magazine show, designed to inform the audience about the various forms of leisure in and around Montreal. The half hour production also featured Hollywood celebrity interviews, Fashion Profiles, local Music news and interviews and a look at the city's hottest restaurant spots and trends.

Entertainment Spotlight aired right after CTV News, Montreal's number 1 English newscast! The program attracted a viewership of well over 225, 000 and targets a comprehensive and far reaching audience coveted by every show and every network. Hollywood movies and interviews with film celebrities, Fashion, Music and "what's cooking in the kitchen of some of Montreal's finest eateries", were just some of the topics featured each week on Entertainment Spotlight.

Updated weekly, the show's official website was www.entertainmentspotlight.ca

As of January 2009, the show will no longer aired due to the expansion of the CTV Weekend News at 6 p.m. The last episode aired December 28, 2008.

Entertainment news shows in Canada
CTV Television Network original programming